Bouchamps-lès-Craon (literally Bouchamps near Craon) is a commune in the Mayenne department in northwestern France.

Geography
The river Oudon forms most of the commune's eastern border.

Population

See also
Communes of Mayenne

References

Communes of Mayenne